Toucouleur may be:

Toucouleur Empire
Toucouleur people
Toucouleur language